Pachaiyappa College Ground or MRF Pachyappas Ground is a multi purpose stadium in Chennai, Tamil Nadu. The ground is mainly used for organizing matches of football, cricket and other sports. The ground was established in 1971 when Annamalai University played against Nagpur University

The stadium has hosted nine Vijay Hazare Trophy matches  from 1964 when Andhra cricket team played against Kerala cricket team until 2010 but since then the stadium has hosted non-first-class matches.

References

External links 
 Cricketarchive
 Cricinfo
 Wikimapia
 Official website

Cricket grounds in Tamil Nadu
Sports venues in Chennai
University sports venues in India
Sports venues completed in 1971
1971 establishments in Tamil Nadu
20th-century architecture in India